TVU Networks Corporation is a privately held technology company. Its headquarter is located in Mountain View California. It has major offices in Shanghai, China, and Barcelona, Spain. They specialize in the development and sale of IP and cloud based products and services. The company was established 2005 by Paul Shen.

History (Early Years)

TVUPlayer was the company’s first product. It was a live streaming TV viewer client that provided free live television programming worldwide. It was viewable from a PC or laptop with a broadband connectionuntil its services stopped on February 25, 2013. 

The company introduced its first IP-based hardware device on September 11, 2010. The TVUPack TM8000 was a mobile news gathering backpack transmitter that allowed broadcasters to deliver a live broadcast-quality HD signal with latency of two seconds over IP, even with limited bandwidth. The aggregated cellular transmission technology used in TVUPack and other similar devices at the time provided an alternative to traditional satellite trucks, helping to change on-location live reporting for television stations.

The technology used in these backpack style cellular transmitters were often referred to as bonded cellular or aggregated cellular within the broadcast industry. The expression refers to “multiple circuits or connections synchronized to provide a more reliable signal than standard consumer wireless connections.” The advantage of backpack transmitters was the ability for news crews in the field to air first or exclusively.

Rapid releases of upgraded and more technologically advanced versions of the TVUPack transmitter were introduced following the TM8000 including the TM8100 and the TM8200 models within two years. With each new version of the early generation backpack transmitters, the form factor and weight were reduced and more product features were added to the software.

The company also began expanding its IP based product line, including the rollout of TVU Anywhere, a newsgathering live video mobile app for iOS and Android devices, and TVU Grid for cloud based point-to-multipoint live video distribution. Gray Television was the first national station group to deploy TVU Grid at launch.

History (Present Day)

In 2015, the company achieved a breakthrough in size and functionality with the rollout of its TVU One portable transmitter as the eventual successor to the original TVUPacks. The new transmitter was 90% smaller than the first generation cellular packs but without any reduction in performance or features. TVU also entered into a partnership with leading drone manufacturer DJI in the same year in which the two companies collaborated on integrating their products for drone applications. 

TVU has shifted its focus in recent years to the development of cloud native applications that address each phase of the broadcast workflow  acquisition, transmission, production, distribution and management. The broadcast industry had been transitioning to IP from transitional SDI with the COVID pandemic accelerating the migration. The need for cloud native and IP products and services in the broadcast industry are a direct result of studios moving away from traditional fixed studio hardware infrastructure to flexible anywhere remote production.

Products

TVU Alert is a cloud-based service that allows users to instantly notify their entire organization or part of their organization about important information.

TVU Anywhere is an app that turns mobile devices or laptops into transmitters that use aggregated cellular and Wi-Fi connections to stream HQ video.

TVU AP ENPS Integration is a collaboration between TVU Networks and the Associated Press to create a newsroom workflow geared toward streamlining the newsgathering process from shooting to editing.

The TVU Aerial Newsgathering Pack integrates its TVU One mobile transmitter with drone technology to enable live high-definition transmission from in the air.

TVU Booking Service lets stations plan and manage streams. Booking Service automatically takes streams live according to a set schedule, and switches between streams without the need for an operator.

TVU Command Center is a cloud-based management system that grants full control over all TVU products and services. Through Command Center, users can adjust latency and bit-rate on TVU transmitters, track receiver locations through a map, add and remove supported devices and manage all TVU Grid content.

TVU Era is a cost-friendly version of the TVU One mobile transmitter and other professional video encoders similar to it. It has most of the features of the TVU One but is designed to be used with a single IP Ethernet connection.

TVU G-Link is a point-to-point transmission solution that allows video to be sent from one location to another using a public Internet connection. TVU G-Link 4K is a rack-mount contribution encoder that supports true 4K60P UHD HDR.

TVU Grid is a live video switching, routing and distribution solution. It allows stations to distribute live streams to a scalable number of other Grid-enabled stations or locations via a web interface.

TVU Me is a virtual marketplace where freelancers and independent production crews can make their live or recorded content available for exchange or purchase. They can also offer services for booking.

TVU MediaMind is a story-centric workflow solution for acquiring, indexing, producing and distributing live video via the cloud. It uses Artificial Intelligence and automation to streamline the production process and archive media assets for reuse.

TVU MLink is a transmitter designed for fixed use in vehicles or studios. It has the same functions as the TVU One but comes in a rack-mountable form, and is capable of integrating with satellite and microwave in addition to or in place of cellular or Wi-Fi connections.

TVU One is a compact mobile IP video transmitter that aggregates multiple connections to decode high quality video with 0.5-second latency. It can hold up to six embedded modems, with optional support for CAT12 3G/4G/LTE global modems. TVU One uses H.265/HEVC compression and runs on TVU Networks’ patented transmission technology, Inverse StatMux Plus, or IS+. TVU One 4K is a version of the TVU One that supports 4K60P output. It is the first portable cellular backpack solution to transmit at this resolution.

TVU Producer is a cloud-based production solution that allows multi-channel IP video switching with titling and graphics capabilities. Users can edit video on a web interface and simultaneously output it to social media or a CDN platform.

TVU Router is a portable Internet access point that uses the patented Inverse StatMux Plus to aggregate communication links to provide up to 200Mbit/s of secure, stable, high-bandwidth IP connection.

TVU Remote Production System (also known as TVU RPS) uses existing studio infrastructure and a standard Internet connection for remote live multi-camera production with up to six synchronized transmissions. It is part of TVU's Remote Production solutions.

TVU Talkshow is a cost-effective turnkey solution for live show and event production with optional bi-directional viewer participation.

TVU Timelock is another part of TVU's Remote Production solutions. It sets up to six TVU transmitters at the same latency to transmit to a video switcher for remote multi-camera production.

TVU Transcriber converts speech to text in real time for both live and recorded videos. It supports multiple languages, can identify and mute profanity, and can output audio as text in a file format to be used for auditing.

References

Television technology
Companies based in Mountain View, California
Companies established in 2005
2005 establishments in California